The Civil Aviation Authority (AAC) is the civil aviation agency of El Salvador. The agency conducts investigations into aviation accidents and incidents. The agency is headquartered in Ilopango Airport in Ilopango, San Salvador Department. Honduran authorities delegated the investigation of the TACA Flight 390 incident to the Salvadoran Civil Aviation Authority as per the Convention on International Civil Aviation.

References

External links

  Civil Aviation Authority

Organizations investigating aviation accidents and incidents
Government of El Salvador
Civil aviation in El Salvador
El Salvador
Aviation organizations based in El Salvador